The correct spelling of this article is D:Ream On Volume 1.  It has been retitled here due to technical limitations.

D:Ream On Volume 1 is the debut album by Northern Irish pop/dance band D:Ream. It was released in late 1993 by Magnet Records label, distributed by Warner Music major, and managed by FXU Management. The album includes D:Ream's biggest hit single, "Things Can Only Get Better", which reached number one in the UK Singles Chart in 1994. The album also includes the song "U R the Best Thing", which was released three times in total. In 1994, the track was remixed, and managed to get to number 4.

Singles
Many singles were released from the album – seven in total, with some of them being issued more than once. These included "U R the Best Thing" which stalled at number 72 in the UK Singles Chart on first release in July 1992. It was later re-issued in 1993 where it reached number 19 and again in 1994 where it peaked at number four. The biggest hit however was  "Things Can Only Get Better" which on initial release in 1993 reached number 24, but on re-release in early 1994, peaked at number one in the UK charts. Other singles taken from the album were: "Unforgiven" (UK No. 29), the double A-sided "Star"/"I Like It" (UK No. 26), "Take Me Away" (UK No. 18) and "Blame It on Me" (UK No. 25).

Critical reception

Alan Jones from Music Week wrote, "Producing uplifting, eclectic and superior dance music that pleases the brain as well as the feet, D:Ream are clearly fans of Italo house, whose joyously pumping piano-based elements are frequently employed here. But they also turn their hand to old-fashioned disco, and "Star" is a fine ballad. A stirring debut that deserves to be heard."

Commercial performance
The album reached number 5 in the UK Albums Chart and remained on the UK charts for 37 weeks, spanning a chart run from October 1993 to November 1994.

Track listing
All tracks written by Peter Cunnah, except where noted.

Personnel

Musicians
Peter Cunnah – lead vocals and all instruments
Al Mackenzie – additional keyboards (track 9)
Tom Frederikse – additional piano (track 9); Hammond organ (track 8)
Gary Meek – Hammond organ, piano (track 9)
Brian Cox – piano (track 10)
Wendon Davis – congas (tracks 8, 10)
Rain Shine – original piano (track 8)
Mark Roberts – additional drums (track 7)
Neville Young – synth drums (track 9)
Time – media (track 2)
Gaetan – additional programming (tracks 6–7)
Gerry Ruddock – trumpet (track 6)

Additional vocalists
Liliana Chacian – voice, spoken in Portuguese (track 5)
Linda Duggan – background vocals (tracks 1, 3–4, 8)
Jamie Petrie – background vocals (tracks 8–9)
Donna Gardier – background vocals (tracks 6–7)
Peter Crooner – background vocals (track 9)
Greta Gront – erotic noises (tracks 3, 6, 9)
Kathleen Pearson-Thomas – background vocals (track 9)
Dylis Duku – background vocals (track 9)
Delphi Newman – background vocals (track 9)
D'Borah Asher – background vocals (track 2)

Production
3M – recording equipment @ Aosis Studios
'T'Sound – mixing device at Roundhouse Studios

Staff
FXU – management
Mark Beder – contacts and info
Simon Fowler – photography
An Artificially Sweetened Sleeve – sleeve

Release details

References

External links
 www.d-ream.net: D:Ream's Official Website
 Discogs: D:Ream's detailed bio-discography with links to all their releases
 Discogs: D:Ream On Volume 1 album details, with links to all related performers
 EveryHit.com: UK Top 40 Database
 Paul Gambaccini, Tim Rice, Jonathan Rice (1995), British Hit Singles, Guinness Publishing

1993 debut albums
D Ream albums
Magnet Records albums
Warner Records albums